Campos may refer to:

Geography 
 Campos (crater), a crater on Mars
 Campos, Spain, a municipality in Mallorca
 Campos Basin, a sedimentary basin offshore of Rio de Janeiro state, named after Campos
 Campos do Jordão, a municipality in the state of São Paulo in southeastern Brazil
 Campos dos Goytacazes, a municipality in Rio de Janeiro state and usually known as Campos
 Campos Gerais, a municipality in Minas Gerais state
 Roman Catholic Diocese of Campos, diocese located in Campos dos Goytacazes, ecclesiastical province of Niterói

Music 
 Campos (band), an Italian rock band

People 
 Campos (surname)
 Campos (footballer) (born 1952), Cosme da Silva Campos, Brazilian footballer

Places 
 Campo's, a deli in Philadelphia known for cheesesteaks and hoagies

Sports 
 Campos Racing, a Spanish motor racing team owned by Adrián Campos
 Torneio Internacional de Tênis Campos do Jordão, a tennis tournament in Campos do Jordão, Brazil